Alleway is a surname. Notable people with the surname include:

 Laura Alleway (born 1989), Australian football player
 Rebecca Alleway, English set decorator

See also
 Alloway (disambiguation)

Surnames of Scottish origin
Surnames of Old English origin